William Villeger (born 22 October 2000) is a French badminton player affiliated with ASPTT Strasbourg club. He won the European junior championships in boys' doubles event in 2018 and won another gold in team event too.

Achievements

European Junior Championships 
Boys' doubles

BWF International Challenge/Series (4 titles, 6 runners-up) 
Men's doubles

Mixed doubles

  BWF International Challenge tournament
  BWF International Series tournament
  BWF Future Series tournament

BWF Junior International (1 title, 3 runners-up) 
Boys' doubles

Mixed doubles

  BWF Junior International Grand Prix tournament
  BWF Junior International Challenge tournament
  BWF Junior International Series tournament
  BWF Junior Future Series tournament

References 

2000 births
Living people
People from Martigues
Sportspeople from Bouches-du-Rhône
French male badminton players